This Now! is an album by American jazz trombonist Steve Swell, which was recorded live in 2001 and released on Cadence Jazz. He leads the Unified Theory of Sound, a sextet with Jemeel Moondoc on alto sax, Matt Lavelle on trumpet, Cooper-Moore on piano, Wilber Morris on bass and Kevin Norton on drums.

Reception

In his review for AllMusic, Steve Loewy states " Swell's writing impresses immeasurably, as he has an ear to the moment so that the backgrounds constantly change and ebb to the machinations of the soloists."

The Penguin Guide to Jazz notes that "Having Cooper-Moore in the group introduces the rarity of a piano into Swell's music and he plays in a neoclassic free-jazz style which actually works very well."

Track listing
All compositions by Steve Swell
"This Now" - 21:47
"BA-I" - 16:51
"Tryarhythmic" - 22:44

Personnel
Steve Swell - trombone
Jemeel Moondoc - alto sax
Matt Lavelle - trumpet
Cooper-Moore  - piano
Wilber Morris - bass
Kevin Norton  - drums

References

2003 live albums
Steve Swell live albums
Cadence Jazz Records live albums